The 2010–11 season will be Paksi SE's 5th competitive season, 5th consecutive season in the Soproni Liga and 58th year in existence as a football club.

Team kit
The team kits for the 2010–11 season are produced by Jako and sponsored by MvM Paksi Atomerőmű. The home kit is green and white colour and the away kit is white and green colour.

Club

Coaching staff

Top scorers
Includes all competitive matches. The list is sorted by shirt number when total goals are equal.

Last updated on 23 November 2010

Disciplinary record
Includes all competitive matches. Players with 1 card or more included only.

Last updated on 23 November 2010

Overall
{|class="wikitable"
|-
|Games played || 20 (15 Soproni Liga, 2 Hungarian Cup and 3 Hungarian League Cup)
|-
|Games won || 11 (7 Soproni Liga, 2 Hungarian Cup and 2 Hungarian League Cup)
|-
|Games drawn || 4 (4 Soproni Liga, 0 Hungarian Cup and 0 Hungarian League Cup)
|-
|Games lost || 5 (4 Soproni Liga, 0 Hungarian Cup and 1 Hungarian League Cup)
|-
|Goals scored || 38
|-
|Goals conceded || 25
|-
|Goal difference || +13
|-
|Yellow cards || 26
|-
|Red cards || 1
|-
|rowspan="3"|Worst discipline ||  Attila Fiola (4 , 0 )
|-
|  Tamás Sifter (4 , 0 )
|-
|  László Bartha (4 , 0 )
|-
|rowspan="2"|Best result || 4–0 (A) v Balatonlelle SE – Hungarian Cup – 22-09-2010
|-
| 4–0 (H) v Lombard-Pápa TFC – Nemzeti Bajnokság I – 09-10-2010
|-
|rowspan="2"|Worst result || 1–3 (A) v Szolnoki MÁV FC – Nemzeti Bajnokság I – 14-08-2010
|-
| 2–4 (A) v MTK Budapest FC – Hungarian League Cup – 24-07-2010
|-
|rowspan="4"|Most appearances ||  Tamás Csehi (17 appearances)
|-
|  Tamás Kiss (17 appearances)
|-
|  Tibor Heffler (17 appearances)
|-
|  László Bartha (17 appearances)
|-
|rowspan="3"|Top scorer ||  Tibor Montvai (5 goals)
|-
|  László Bartha (5 goals)
|-
|  Dániel Böde (5 goals)
|-
|Points || 37/60 (61.67%)
|-

Nemzeti Bajnokság I

Classification

Results summary

Results by round

Matches

Ferencvárosi TC: Ranilovic – Stockley, Csizmadia, Tutoric, Junior – Andrezinho (Abdi 69.), Maróti, Stanic (Rodenbücher 86.), Rósa, B. Tóth (D. Kulcsár 79.) – Heinz. Coach: László Prukner.
Paksi SE: A. Kovács – Sifter, Fiola, J. Szabó, Csehi – Bartha (Miskolczi 86.), T. Heffler, Sipeki (Palásthy 82.), Lisztes (T. Kiss 68.), Vayer – Montvai. Coach: Károly Kis.
G.: Heinz (10.), J. Szabó (33. – o.g.) – Bartha (8.)
Y.: Tutoric (31.), B. Tóth (38.), Csizmadia (68.) – Bartha (84.)

Paksi SE: A. Kovács (Csernyánszki 46.) – Fiola, Sifter, J. Szabó, T. Csehi – Bartha, T. Heffler, Lisztes (Dudás 46.; Haraszti 78.), Sipeki – Montvai, T. Kiss. Coach: Károly Kis.
Debreceni VSC: Malinauskas – Z. Nagy, Simac, Komlósi, Laczkó – Bódi, Ramos, P. Szakály (Spitzmüller 46.), Yannick – P. Szilágyi (B. Farkas 73.), Kabát (Coulibaly 65.). Coach: András Herczeg.
G.: Montvai (5.), T. Heffler (84. – pen) – Kabát (4.), Simac (40.)
Y.: Fiola (16.), Bartha (87.) – Komlósi (54.), Ramos (83.)
R.: Yannick (21.)

Szolnoki MÁV FC: Tarczy – Schindler, Hegedűs, Pető (Vörös 46.), Hevesi-Tóth – Búrány, Molnár, Tchami (Koós 64.), Remili – Alex (Lengyel 73.), Pisanjuk. Coach: Attila Vágó.
Paksi SE: Csernyánszki – Sifter, Éger, Fiola, Csehi (Gévay 46.) – Bartha (Tóth 74.), Böde (Lisztes 12.), Sipeki, Heffler – Montvai, Kiss. Coach: Károly Kis.
G.: Alex (23.), Remili (45. – pen.), Lengyel (92.) – Sipeki (63.)
Y.: Pisanjuk (45.), Lengyel (77.) – Sipeki (52.)

Paksi SE: Csernyánszki – Miskolczi, Éger, Fiola, Csehi – Bartha, Kiss, Sifter, Sipeki (Böde 70.), Heffler (Vayer 64.) – Montvai. Coach: Károly Kis.
Zalaegerszegi TE: Vlaszák – Kovács, Bogunovic, Miljatovic, Varga – Szalai, Kamber (Horváth 82.), Máté, Magasföldi (Rajcomar 46.) – Pavicevic, Balázs (Illés 46.). Coach: János Csank.
G.: Montvai (29.), Kiss (43.) – Kamber (13.), Rajcomar (47.)
Y.: Sifter (40.) – Kovács (39.), Rajcomar (47.), Bogunovic (53.)

Szombathelyi Haladás: Rózsa – Schimmer, Guzmics, Lengyel, Tóth – Rajos, Korolovszky, Á. Simon – Ugrai (Rócz 56.), Kenesei (A. Simon 79.), Oross. Coach: Aurél Csertői.
Paksi SE: Csernyánszki – Fiola, Éger, Sifter, Csehi – Bartha (Magasföldi 60.), Sipeki, Heffler, Miskolczi (Vayer 23.) – Kiss, Montvai. Coach: Károly Kis.
G.: Kenesei (40.) – Sifter (29.), Vayer (89.)
Y.: Sifter (2.), Bartha (12.), Heffler (82.), Magasföldi (90.)

Paksi SE: Csernyánszki – Sifter, Fiola, Éger (Böde 71.), Csehi – Heffler, Kiss (Mészáros 86.), Sipeki – Bartha (Báló 89.), Montvai, Vayer.. Coach: Károly Kis.
Lombard-Pápa TFC: Szűcs – Rajnay, Bíró, Farkas, Takács – Quintero (Rebryk 51.), Gyömbér, Heffler – Abwo, Bárányos, Maric (Bali 80.). Coach: György Véber.
G.: Bartha (43., 87.), Vayer (49.), Montvai (68.)
Y.: Rajnay (26.), Rebryk (88.)

Kaposvári Rákóczi FC: Kovács – Lelkes, Grúz (Zahorecz 67.), Zsók, Gujic – Szepessy (Kulcsár 75.), Pedro, Hegedűs, Balázs (Zsolnai 62.) – Oláh, Jawad. Coach: Tibor Sisa.
Paksi SE: Csernyánszki – Fiola, Éger, Sifter (Szabó 65.), Ceehi – Bartha, Heffler, Sipeki (Böde 46.), Vayer – Montvai, Kiss (Magasföldi 85.). Coach: Károly Kis.
G.: Oláh (25. – pen.) – Böde (61.), Montvai (65.)
Y.: Balázs (35.), Zsók (47.), Lelkes (57.) – Sifter (30.), Éger (62.), Fiola (91.)

Kecskeméti TE: Rybánsky – Balogh (Wilson 85.), Gyagya, Lambulic, Mohl – Alempijevic, Cukic, Koncz – Litsingi (Csordás 56.), Tököli, Foxi (Bori 72.). Coach: István Urbányi.
Paksi SE: Csernyánszki – Heffler (Lisztes 91.), Fiola, Éger, Csehi – Sipeki, Bartha, Böde, Vayer (Báló 74.) – Montvai, Kiss (Magasföldi 65.). Coach: Károly Kis.
G.: Montvai (90.+4)
Y.: Fiola (44.), Böde (47.), Csehi (75.), Éger (79.), Montvai (82.)
R.: Alempijevic (69.) – Magasföldi (77.)

Paksi SE: Csernyánszki – Fiola, Éger, Sifter, Csehi – Bartha (Böde 60.), Sipeki, Heffler, Vayer – Kiss (Nagy 77.), Montvai. Coach: Károly Kis.
Budapest Honvéd FC: Kemenes – Sós, Botis, Debreceni, Hajdú – Abass, Coira, Akassou, Sadjo (Bojtor 77.) – Rouani (Danilo 69.), Rufino (Horváth 86.). Coach: Massimo Morales.
G.: Bojtor (81.)
Y.: Sadjo (14.)

Videoton FC Fehérvár: Bozovic – Lázár, Lipták, Vaskó, Andic – Gosztonyi (Szakály 69.), Farkas, Sándor, Polonkai (Vasiljevic 80.) – Lencse (Mutumba 69.), Alves. Coach: György Mezey.
Paksi SE: Csernyánszki – Fiola, Éger, Sifter, Csehi – Bartha (Báló 81.), Böde, Heffler, Vayer – Kiss (Magasföldi 76.), Montvai (Vári 81.). Coach: Károly Kis.
G.: Gosztonyi (11.), Alves (43. – pen.) – Éger (86. – pen.)
Y.: Lipták (85.) – Csernyánszki (43.)

Paksi SE: Csernyánszki – Heffler, Éger, Fiola (Lisztes 93.), Csehi – Magasföldi (Báló 65.), Böde, Sifter, Vayer – Bartha, Montvai (Kiss 62.). Coach: Károly Kis.
Győri ETO FC: Sánta – Fehér, Stanisic, Eugene, Völgyi – Dinjar (Aleksidze 51.), Copa (Szabó 68.), Pilibaitis, Trajkovic – Bouguerra, Koltai (Ceolin 46.). Coach: Attila Pintér.
G.: Vayer (75.), Böde (79.) – Bouguerra (62.)
Y.: Völgyi (35.), Szabó (74.), Stanisic (77.), Pilibaitis (77.), Eugene (91.)

Újpest FC: Balajcza – Szokol, Kiss, Vermes, Pollák – Simek (Barczi 72.), Egerszegi, Matos (Rajczi 46.), Mitrovic, Simon (Böőr 46.) – Tisza. Coach: Géza Mészöly.
Paksi SE: Csernyánszki – Heffler, Éger, Szabó, Csehi – Bartha, Sifter, Böde, Sipeki (Kiss 52.), Vayer (Báló 90.) – Montvai (Magasföldi 75.). Coach: Károly Kis.
G.: Tisza (44.), Böőr (50.) – Éger (16.), Böde (32.), Bartha (60.)
Y.: Mitrovic (68.) – Csehi (27.), Kiss (70.)

Paksi SE: Csernyánszki – Heffler, Éger, Szabó, Csehi – Bartha (Lisztes 28.), Böde, Sifter, Sipeki (Kiss 46.) – Montvai, Vayer (Magasföldi 46.). Coach: Károly Kis.
BFC Siófok: Molnár – Mogyorósi, Fehér, Graszl, Novák – Homma (Délczeg 79.), Tusori, Kecskés, Lukács (Piller 78.) – Sowunmi, Ivancsics. Coach: István Mihalecz.
G.: —
Y.: Kiss (53.) – Mogyorósi (81.)

Vasas SC: Végh – Balog, Arnaut, Gáspár, Polényi (Mileusnic 46.) – Arsic, Bakos (Pavicevic 72.), Mundi (Beliczky 64.), Németh – Lázok, Ferenczi. Coach: András Komjáti.
Paksi SE: Csernyánszki – Heffler, Fiola (Vári 87.), Szabó, Csehi – Báló (Vayer 64.), Böde, Sifter, Sipeki (Magasföldi 59.) – Bartha, Kiss. Coach: Károly Kis.
G.: Ferenczi (13.), Németh (36.) – Kiss (21.), Heffler (50.), Böde (62.)
Y.: Polényi (25.), Bakos (47.), Balog (68.) – Sifter (28.), Bartha (89.)

Paksi SE: Csernyánszki – Heffler, Fiola, Éger, Csehi – Böde, Sifter, Sipeki, Vayer – Bartha (Magasföldi 61.), Kiss (Montvai 56.). Coach: Károly Kis.
MTK Budapest FC: Szatmári – Szekeres, Sütő, Vadnai – Vukadinovic, Vukmir, Szabó (Eppel 68.), Ladányi (Nikházi 92.), Kanta – Tischler (A. Pál 46.), Könyves. Coach: József Garami.
G.: Böde (81.) – Könyves (73.)
Y.: Vukmir (66.), Kanta (91.)

Hungarian Cup

Third round

Balatonelle SE: Szabó – Kenéz, Sylla (Bőrczy 54.), Kovács, Gelencsér – Makarész, Bodrogi (Ágoston 29.), Petronovics (Zsiga 52.), Valla – Galgóczi, Graszl. Coach: Ferenc Keszei.
Paksi SE: Kovács – Mészáros, Szabó, Gévay, Báló – Dudás (Bohner 63.), Böde (Fiola 63.), Nagy, Haraszti – Magasföldi (Lisztes 54.), Vári. Coach: Károly Kis.
G.: Gévay (22., 83.), Dudás (45.), Nagy (47. – pen.)
Y.: Valla (58.) – Szabó (38.)

Fourth round

Pécsi Mecsek FC: Dibusz – J. Nagy, Stark, Todorovic, Törtei – Regedei, Pintér – O. Nagy (Stojanovski 68.), Bozsik (Horváth 61.), Lovrencsics (Kvekveskiri 80.) – Gyánó. Coach: László Kiss.
Paksi SE: Kovács – Heffler, Éger, Szabó, Sifter – Báló (Vayer 58.), Csehi, Kiss (Sipeki 86.), Magasföldi – Bartha (Lisztes 46.), Montvai. Coach: Károly Kis.
G.: Éger (63.)
Y.: Stark (67.), Horváth (73.)

Hungarian League Cup

Group stage

MTK Budapest FC: Horváth – Hajdú, Kálnoki-Kis, Forró, Gál – Kelemen, Kákonyi, Macura (Kornis 70.), Molnár (Csiki 70.) – Sz. Pál, L. Szabó (Ódé 70.). Coach: Gábor Pölöskei.
Paksi SE: Kovács – Miskolczi (Mészáros 57.), Éger (Fiola 36.), Szabó, Csehi (Vayer 38.) – Kiss (Bartha 38.), Heffler, Sifter, Báló – Böde (Lisztes 38.), Montvai. Coach: Károly Kis.
G.: Sz. Pál (6., 14.), Molnár (31., 39.) – Bartha (41.), Lisztes (63.)
Y.: L. Szabó (34.), Gál (83.) – Fiola (54.)

Paksi SE: Kovács – Gévay, Tóth, Báló (Berkó 72.), Mészáros – Lisztes, Haraszti (Pintér 65.), Dudás, Vári – Magasföldi, Bohner (Pap 81.). Coach: Károly Kis.
Vasas SC: Tulipán – Kovács, Görgényi, Pavicevic, Dobric (Loussaief 46.) – Mundi (Fürjes 75.), Katona, Arsic (Beliczky 57.), Ferenczi (Hristov 72.) – Hrepka, Polényi. Coach: András Komjáti.
G.: Tóth (32.), Lisztes (60.)
Y.: Pavicevic (81.)

Vasas SC: Tulipán – Kovács, Görgényi, Loussaief, Bakos – Mundi, Katona, Beliczky, Pantkhava (Csoór 75.) – Polényi, Hristov (Balogh 55.). Coach: András Komjáti.
Paksi SE: Kovács – Szabó, Gévay, Báló, Mészáros – Lisztes, Nagy (Cziráki 81.), Haraszti, Vári (Pap 76.) – Magasföldi, Bohner. Coach: Károly Kis.
G.: Phantkhava (39.) – Bohner (35.), Nagy (47.), Vári (52.), Lisztes (67.)
Y.: Kovács (52.) – Gévay (33.), Szabó (90.)

External links
 Stadium
 Eufo
 Official Website
 UEFA
 fixtures and results

2010–11
Hungarian football clubs 2010–11 season